Stein Erik Tafjord (born 2 November 1953 in Langevåg, Norway) is a Norwegian jazz musician (tuba), and brother of the French horn player Runar Tafjord. He is most well known for being part of The Brazz Brothers. He was also one of the founders Ytre Suløens Jass Ensemble in 1973, where he played for 17 years. He has four children, and between them are the hornplayer Hild Sofie Tafjord.

Career 
Tafjord is a graduate of Norges Musikkhøgskole i Oslo. After many years as participant of the Kringkastingsorkesteret, he started as a freelance jazz and studio musician. Tafjord has developed a very unconventional style of playing as improviser, which has had an influence on composers and others musicians, to be more aware of the tuba as instrument.

He has toured with several international orchestras and groups, such as the Scandinavian Tuba Jazz Inc. and Carla Bley Scandinavian Jazz Ensemble. He has worked with the singer and actress Elisabeth Lindland in several different contexts.

Honors 
1991: Buddyprisen

References

External links

20th-century Norwegian tubists
21st-century Norwegian tubists
Norwegian jazz tubists
Norwegian jazz composers
Norwegian music educators
Musicians from Langevåg
1953 births
Living people
The Brazz Brothers members